Intelligence has been defined in many ways: the capacity for abstraction, logic, understanding, self-awareness, learning, emotional knowledge, reasoning, planning, creativity, critical thinking, and problem-solving. More generally, it can be described as the ability to perceive or infer information, and to retain it as knowledge to be applied towards adaptive behaviors within an environment or context.

Intelligence is most often studied in humans but has also been observed in both non-human animals and in plants despite controversy as to whether some of these forms of life exhibit intelligence. Intelligence in computers or other machines is called artificial intelligence.

Etymology 

The word intelligence derives from the Latin nouns intelligentia or intellēctus, which in turn stem from the verb intelligere, to comprehend or perceive. In the Middle Ages, the word intellectus became the scholarly technical term for understanding, and a translation for the Greek philosophical term nous. This term, however, was strongly linked to the metaphysical and cosmological theories of teleological scholasticism, including theories of the immortality of the soul, and the concept of the active intellect (also known as the active intelligence). This approach to the study of nature was strongly rejected by the early modern philosophers such as Francis Bacon, Thomas Hobbes, John Locke, and David Hume, all of whom preferred "understanding" (in place of "intellectus" or "intelligence") in their English philosophical works. Hobbes for example, in his Latin De Corpore, used "intellectus intelligit", translated in the English version as "the understanding understandeth", as a typical example of a logical absurdity. "Intelligence" has therefore become less common in English language philosophy, but it has later been taken up (with the scholastic theories which it now implies) in more contemporary psychology.

Definitions 

The definition of intelligence is controversial, varying in what its abilities are and whether or not it is quantifiable. Some groups of psychologists have suggested the following definitions:

From "Mainstream Science on Intelligence" (1994), an op-ed statement in the Wall Street Journal signed by fifty-two researchers (out of 131 total invited to sign):

From Intelligence: Knowns and Unknowns (1995), a report published by the Board of Scientific Affairs of the American Psychological Association:

Besides those definitions, psychology and learning researchers also have suggested definitions of intelligence such as the following:

Human 

Human intelligence is the intellectual power of humans, which is marked by complex cognitive feats and high levels of motivation and self-awareness. Intelligence enables humans to remember descriptions of things and use those descriptions in future behaviors. It is a cognitive process. It gives humans the cognitive abilities to learn, form concepts, understand, and reason, including the capacities to recognize patterns, innovate, plan, solve problems, and employ language to communicate. Intelligence enables humans to experience and think.

Intelligence is different from learning. Learning refers to the act of retaining facts and information or abilities and being able to recall them for future use, while intelligence is the cognitive ability of someone to perform these and other processes. There have been various attempts to quantify intelligence via testing, such as the Intelligence Quotient (IQ) test. However, many people disagree with the validity of IQ tests, stating that they cannot accurately measure intelligence.

There is debate about if human intelligence is based on hereditary factors or if it is based on environmental factors. Hereditary intelligence is the theory that intelligence is fixed upon birth and not able to grow. Environmental intelligence is the theory that intelligence is developed throughout life depending on the environment around the person. An environment that cultivates intelligence is one that challenges the person's cognitive abilities.

Much of the above definition applies also to the intelligence of non-human animals.

Emotional 

Emotional intelligence is thought to be the ability to convey emotion to others in an understandable way as well as to read the emotions of others accurately. Some theories imply that a heightened emotional intelligence could also lead to faster generating and processing of emotions in addition to the accuracy. In addition, higher emotional intelligence is thought to help us manage emotions, which is beneficial for our problem-solving skills. Emotional intelligence is important to our mental health and has ties into social intelligence.

Social 

Social intelligence is the ability to understand the social cues and motivations of others and oneself in social situations. It is thought to be distinct to other types of intelligence, but has relations to emotional intelligence. Social intelligence has coincided with other studies that focus on how we make judgements of others, the accuracy with which we do so, and why people would be viewed as having positive or negative social character. There is debate as to whether or not these studies and social intelligence come from the same theories or if there is a distinction between them, and they are generally thought to be of two different schools of thought.

Book smart and street smart 
Concepts of "book smarts" and "street smart" are contrasting views based on the premise that some people have knowledge gained through academic study, but may lack the experience to sensibly apply that knowledge, while others have knowledge gained through practical experience, but may lack accurate information usually gained through study by which to effectively apply that knowledge. Artificial intelligence researcher Hector Levesque has noted that:

Nonhuman animal 

Although humans have been the primary focus of intelligence researchers, scientists have also attempted to investigate animal intelligence, or more broadly, animal cognition. These researchers are interested in studying both mental ability in a particular species, and comparing abilities between species. They study various measures of problem solving, as well as numerical and verbal reasoning abilities. Some challenges in this area are defining intelligence so that it has the same meaning across species (e.g. comparing intelligence between literate humans and illiterate animals), and also operationalizing a measure that accurately compares mental ability across different species and contexts.

Wolfgang Köhler's research on the intelligence of apes is an example of research in this area. Stanley Coren's book, The Intelligence of Dogs is a notable book on the topic of dog intelligence. (See also: Dog intelligence.) Non-human animals particularly noted and studied for their intelligence include chimpanzees, bonobos (notably the language-using Kanzi) and other great apes, dolphins, elephants and to some extent parrots, rats and ravens.

Cephalopod intelligence also provides an important comparative study. Cephalopods appear to exhibit characteristics of significant intelligence, yet their nervous systems differ radically from those of backboned animals. Vertebrates such as mammals, birds, reptiles and fish have shown a fairly high degree of intellect that varies according to each species. The same is true with arthropods.

g factor in non-humans 

Evidence of a general factor of intelligence has been observed in non-human animals. The general factor of intelligence, or g factor, is a psychometric construct that summarizes the correlations observed between an individual's scores on a wide range of cognitive abilities. First described in humans, the g factor has since been identified in a number of non-human species.

Cognitive ability and intelligence cannot be measured using the same, largely verbally dependent, scales developed for humans. Instead, intelligence is measured using a variety of interactive and observational tools focusing on innovation, habit reversal, social learning, and responses to novelty. Studies have shown that g is responsible for 47% of the individual variance in cognitive ability measures in primates and between 55% and 60% of the variance in mice (Locurto, Locurto). These values are similar to the accepted variance in IQ explained by g in humans (40–50%).

Plant 

It has been argued that plants should also be classified as intelligent based on their ability to sense and model external and internal environments and adjust their morphology, physiology and phenotype accordingly to ensure self-preservation and reproduction.

A counter argument is that intelligence is commonly understood to involve the creation and use of persistent memories as opposed to computation that does not involve learning. If this is accepted as definitive of intelligence, then it includes the artificial intelligence of robots capable of "machine learning", but excludes those purely autonomic sense-reaction responses that can be observed in many plants. Plants are not limited to automated sensory-motor responses, however, they are capable of discriminating positive and negative experiences and of "learning" (registering memories) from their past experiences. They are also capable of communication, accurately computing their circumstances, using sophisticated cost–benefit analysis and taking tightly controlled actions to mitigate and control the diverse environmental stressors.

Artificial 

Scholars studying artificial intelligence have proposed definitions of intelligence that include the intelligence demonstrated by machines. Some of these definitions are meant to be general enough to encompass human and other animal intelligence as well. An intelligent agent can be defined as a system that perceives its environment and takes actions which maximize its chances of success. Kaplan and Haenlein define artificial intelligence as "a system's ability to correctly interpret external data, to learn from such data, and to use those learnings to achieve specific goals and tasks through flexible adaptation". Progress in artificial intelligence can be demonstrated in benchmarks ranging from games to practical tasks such as protein folding. Existing AI lags humans in terms of general intelligence, which is sometimes defined as the "capacity to learn how to carry out a huge range of tasks".

Singularitarian Eliezer Yudkowsky provides a loose qualitative definition of intelligence as "that sort of smartish stuff coming out of brains, which can play chess, and price bonds, and persuade people to buy bonds, and invent guns, and figure out gravity by looking at wandering lights in the sky; and which, if a machine intelligence had it in large quantities, might let it invent molecular nanotechnology; and so on". Mathematician Olle Häggström defines intelligence in terms of "optimization power", an agent's capacity for efficient cross-domain optimization of the world according to the agent's preferences, or more simply the ability to "steer the future into regions of possibility ranked high in a preference ordering". In this optimization framework, Deep Blue has the power to "steer a chessboard's future into a subspace of possibility which it labels as 'winning', despite attempts by Garry Kasparov to steer the future elsewhere." Hutter and Legg, after surveying the literature, define intelligence as "an agent's ability to achieve goals in a wide range of environments". While cognitive ability is sometimes measured as a one-dimensional parameter, it could also be represented as a "hypersurface in a multidimensional space" to compare systems that are good at different intellectual tasks. Some skeptics believe that there is no meaningful way to define intelligence, aside from "just pointing to ourselves".

See also

References

Further reading

External links 

 
 History of Influences in the Development of Intelligence Theory and Testing  – Developed by Jonathan Plucker at Indiana University
 The Limits of Intelligence: The laws of physics may well prevent the human brain from evolving into an ever more powerful thinking machine by Douglas Fox in Scientific American, 14 June 2011.
 A Collection of Definitions of Intelligence
 | Causal Entropic Forces
Scholarly journals and societies
 Intelligence (journal homepage)
 International Society for Intelligence Research (homepage)

Intelligence
Developmental psychology
Psychological testing
Differential psychology